Kim Sa-wol is a South Korean singer-songwriter. She debuted in 2014 with the extended play Secret, a collaboration with singer Kim Hae-won. The duo won Best New Artist and Best Folk Album the following year at the 2015 Korean Music Awards. She has since released the full-length albums Suzanne (2015), Romance (2018) and Heaven (2020).

Discography

Studio albums

Extended plays

Awards and nominations

References

External links 

South Korean women singers
21st-century South Korean singers
Folk singers
Contemporary folk musicians
Living people

Year of birth missing (living people)
South Korean folk singers